LKA may refer to:

 Gewayantana Airport (IATA: LKA), Indonesia
 Idalaka language of East Timor, ISO 639 code 
 Lalit Kala Akademi, India's national academy of fine arts
 Landeskriminalamt (State Criminal Police), police agency of a German state
 Lane-Keeping Assist, a lane departure warning system which keeps vehicles in lane
 Lietuvos krepšinio asociacija, precursor to the Lithuanian Basketball League Lietuvos krepšinio lyga
 Lithuanian Space Association (Lietuvos Kosmoso Asociacija)
 US Navy designation for an amphibious cargo ship
 LKA Longhorn, a music venue in Stuttgart, Germany
 Łódzka Kolej Aglomeracyjna or ŁKA (Łódź Metropolitan Railway), Poland
 Switzerland women's ice hockey league (Leistungsklasse A)